Telemaque, the French name for the Greek mythological figure Telemachus, may refer to:

Opera
Télémaque (Campra), a 1704 opera by André Campra
Télémaque (Destouches), a 1714 opera by André Cardinal Destouches

People
Darwin Telemaque (born 1968), Dominican footballer
Denmark Vesey (1767–1822), American rebel slave known as Telemaque while enslaved
Hervé Télémaque (born 1937), French painter
Vaughn Telemaque (born 1990), American football player

See also
Les Aventures de Télémaque, a 1699 novel
 Telemaco (disambiguation)
Telemachus (disambiguation)